Cui Qi may refer to:

 Cui Qi (footballer, born 1993), Chinese footballer
 Cui Qi (footballer, born 1997), Chinese footballer
 Daniel C. Tsui, Chinese-born American physicist, also known as Cui Qi